Exene Cervenka (born Christene Lee Cervenka; February 1, 1956) is an American singer, artist, and poet.  She is best known for her work as a singer in the California punk rock band X.

Music career 

The 21-year-old Cervenka met 23-year-old musician John Doe at a poetry workshop at the Beyond Baroque Foundation in Venice, California. Cervenka started working there.

Billy Zoom (guitar) and John Doe (bass and vocals) founded X in 1977, with D.J. Bonebrake coming aboard as drummer. Doe asked Cervenka to join soon after as a co-lead vocalist, and the duo were also the band's primary songwriters. They released their debut album, Los Angeles, in 1980 and, over the next six years, five more albums.

She learned to play guitar from Dave Alvin of The Blasters.

Collaborations 

In 1982, Cervenka published Adulterers Anonymous, her first in a series of four books in collaboration with artist Lydia Lunch. She and Lunch also released a spoken word album, Rude Hieroglyphics, in 1996 and toured in support of the project.

From 1996 to 1999, John Roecker and Cervenka co-owned the Los Angeles store "You've Got Bad Taste." The store specialized in kitsch and various "off-color" novelties.

In 1999, as Exene Červenková, she appeared in the cult video Decoupage 2000: Return of the Goddess, along with guests Karen Black and the band L7. She gave a reading of her poem "They Must Be Angels," and appeared in an interview skit with Decoupage 2000 hostess Summer Caprice.

Art career 
In 2005, Cervenka's journals and mixed media collages were exhibited in a one-person exhibition titled America the Beautiful at the Santa Monica Museum of Art. The exhibit was curated by Kristine McKenna and Michael Duncan. An expanded version of the exhibition traveled to DCKT Contemporary in New York in January 2006.

Personal life 
Cervenka was married to John Doe from 1980 to 1985. She met her second husband Viggo Mortensen in 1986 on the set of the comedy Salvation!, a parody of televangelism. Mortensen played her husband Jerome. They married on July 8, 1987. On January 28, 1988, Cervenka gave birth to a son, Henry Blake Mortensen. Mortensen and Cervenka lived in Idaho for three years. They separated in 1992, and were divorced in 1997.

Cervenka married musician Jason Edge, who went on to play in her band Original Sinners. Edge and Cervenka are now divorced.

Cervenka moved from Los Angeles to Jefferson City, Missouri, for four years, and then returned to Southern California. She now lives in Orange County.

Health 
On June 2, 2009, Cervenka released a statement revealing that she had been diagnosed with multiple sclerosis. Well before this diagnosis, she and X had actively supported Sweet Relief, a charity that aids uninsured artists. Sweet Relief was begun by musician Victoria Williams when she herself was diagnosed with MS. In 2011, Cervenka said she may have been misdiagnosed. However, Cervenka had to cancel a Spring 2011 tour due to problems associated with her MS. During a July 2015 interview, John Doe said that the multiple sclerosis diagnosis was a misdiagnosis, that Cervenka, after consulting with various doctors who were not able to diagnose her, is healthy.

Conspiracy theories 
Cervenka, as a self-styled "conspiracy therapist," has provoked controversy on social media and on YouTube, under the name "Christine Notmyrealname," by advancing conspiracy theories including the view that the Isla Vista shootings were a hoax designed to bring about stricter gun control laws. After the backlash, she has issued an apology on her Facebook and Twitter accounts and her conspiracy related YouTube videos are no longer available for viewing. However, when pressed in interviews, Cervenka has insisted on a talking point of a "fake" news media, and has given tacit approval to what critics describe as fringe ideologies espoused on message boards and by then-President Donald Trump.

Discography

X

Singles, soundtracks, compilations, etc. 
 1978: Adult Books/We're Desperate 7" (Dangerhouse Records)
 1979: Yes L.A. compilation (Dangerhouse Records)
 1980: The Decline of Western Civilization soundtrack (Spheeris Films/Slash Records): "Beyond and Back," "Johnny Hit and Run Paulene," "Nausea," "Unheard Music," "We're Desperate"
 1980: No Questions Asked by Flesh Eaters (Slash Records)
 1982: Urgh! A Music War soundtrack (A&M Records)

Albums 
 1980: Los Angeles (Slash Records)
 1981: Wild Gift (Slash Records)
 1982: Under the Big Black Sun (Elektra Records)
 1983: More Fun in the New World (Elektra Records)
 1985: Ain't Love Grand! (Elektra Records)
 1987: See How We Are (Elektra Records/Asylum Records)
 1988: Live at the Whisky a Go-Go (Elektra/Asylum Records)
 1993: Hey Zeus! (Big Life Records)
 1995: Unclogged (Infidelity Recordings/Sunset Boulevard)
 1997: Beyond and Back: The X Anthology (Elektra Records)
 2004: The Best: Make the Music Go Bang! (Elektra Records/Rhino Records)
 2005: X – Live in Los Angeles (Shout! Factory)
 2020: Alphabetland (Fat Possum Records)

The Knitters 
 1985: Poor Little Critter on the Road (Slash Records/Rhino Records)
 2005: The Modern Sounds of the Knitters (Zoë Records)

Solo 
 1989: Old Wives' Tales (Rhino Records)
 1990: Running Sacred (RNA (Rhino New Artists))
 1994: Exene Cervenka (Wordcore Volume 7) 7" (Kill Rock Stars)
 1995: Surface To Air Serpents (213CD/Thirsty Ear Recordings)
 2009: Somewhere Gone (Bloodshot Records)
 2011: The Excitement of Maybe (Bloodshot Records)

Bands 
 1997: Life Could Be a Dream as Auntie Christ (Lookout Records)
 2002: Original Sinners as Original Sinners (Nitro Records)
 2006: Sev7en as Exene Cervenka and the Original Sinners (Nitro Records)

Other 
 1985: Wanda Coleman, Exene Cervenka: Twin Sisters LP (Freeway). Poetry performance recorded at McCabe's Guitar Shop, Santa Monica, CA on February 1, 1985.
 1995: Lydia Lunch & Exene Cervenka: Rude Hieroglyphics (Rykodisc). Recorded live at the Sapphire Supper Club, Orlando, FL on March 20, 1995.
 1999: Decoupage 2000: Return of the Goddess. Read poem "They Must Be Angels" and appeared in an interview skit.
 2012: John Doe & Exene Cervenka: Singing and Playing (Moonlight Graham Records). Recorded at Way Station April 2–3, 2010.

Additional musical contributions 
 1994: Applegate, Christina, and Elizabeth Pena. Across the Moon. Los Angeles, CA: Hemdale Home Video, 1994.  Music composed by Christopher Tyng & Exene Cervenka
 1996: Honor: A Benefit for the Honor the Earth Campaign (Daemon Records). "The Future is a War" by Exene Cervenka
 1997: G.I. Jane original soundtrack (Hollywood Records). "The Future is a War" by Auntie Christ
 1999: One Man's Meat by Viggo Mortensen (Lightning Creek). Features Exene Cervenka on vocals, guitar
 2000: Stoned Immaculate: The Music of The Doors (Elektra Records). "Children of Night" by Perry Farrell and Exene
 2001: Punk-o-rama 2001, Vol. 6 (Epitaph Records). "We're Desperate" by Pennywise with Exene
 2002: Rise Above: 24 Black Flag Songs to Benefit the West Memphis Three (Sanctuary). "Wasted" by Exene Cervenka
 2009: The People Speak original soundtrack (Verve Records). "See How We Are" by Exene Cervenka & John Doe
 2011: Kings and Queens by Blackie and the Rodeo Kings (Dramatico). "Made of Love" featuring Exene Cervenka
 2018: "Queen for a Day" by Skating Polly featuring and also written by Exene Cervenka
 2018: "Destroying Angels" by Garbage with John Doe and Exene Cervenka

Video 
 The Decline of Western Civilization (1981)
 Urgh! A Music War (1982)
 X: The Unheard Music (1985/1987, video; 1986/1987/2004, DVD; re-released 2011 Silver Anniversary Edition)
 X - Live in Los Angeles (2005) – Shout! Factory: Concert by X in Los Angeles recorded live on November 26 and 27, 2004

Works or publications 
 Lunch, Lydia, and Exene Cervenka. Adulterers Anonymous. New York: Grove Press, 1982. 
 The 1984 Calendar of Olympic Games, Music & Orwellian Dates. 1984, n.d. Produced by M. Hyatt, Exene Cervenka and 53 mail artists from around the world.
 Bad Day: A Short Film by Modi Frank and Exene Cervenka. (1986)
 Mohr, Bill, and Sheree Levin. Poetry Loves Poetry: An Anthology of Los Angeles Poets. Santa Monica, CA: Momentum Press, 1985. 
 Jarecke, Kenneth, and Exene Cervenka. Just Another War. Joliet, Mont: Bedrock Press, 1992. 
 Cervenka, Exene. Virtual Unreality. Los Angeles: 2.13.61 Publications, 1993. 
 Cervenka, Exene. "Consumption." Details Magazine, July 1993. (poem)
 Cervenka, Exene. "Acres of Defeat." Raygun Magazine, Dec./Jan 1993. (article)
 Cervenka, Exene. "Midnight Black." L.A. Weekly Magazine, Best of L.A. Issue, 1993. (poem)
 Lake, Bambi, and Alvin Orloff. The Unsinkable Bambi Lake: A Fairy Tale Containing the Dish on Cockettes, Punks, and Angels. San Francisco: Manic D Press, 1996.  Introduction by Exene Cervenka
 Snowden, Don, and Gary Leonard. Make the Music Go Bang!: The Early L.A. Punk Scene. New York: St. Martin's Griffin, 1997.  "Halos Above Our Horns" by Exene Cervenkova. (essay)
 Rollins, Henry. The Best of 2.13.61 Publications. Los Angeles: 2.13.61 Publications, 1998.  (excerpts from "Virtual Unreality")
 Maybe, Ellyn, and Exene Cervenka. The Cowardice of Amnesia. Los Angeles: 2.13.61 Publications, 1998. 
 Hyatt, Michael, and Exene Cervenka. Lucky 13 Postcards. Los Angeles, Calif: s.n., 2000.
 Cervenka, Exene. A Beer on Every Page. 2002.
 Jocoy, Jim, Thurston Moore, and Exene Cervenka. We're Desperate: The Punk Photography of Jim Jocoy : SF/LA 78–80. New York, NY: PowerHouse Books, 2002.  "Slivery Moon" (essay)
 Kihn, Greg. Carved in Rock: Short Stories by Musicians. New York: Thunder's Mouth Press, 2003.  features short story "Perfect World from Virtual Unreality" by Exene Cervenka
 Cervenka, Exene, and Viggo Mortensen. Magical Meteorite Songwriting Device: Collages. Santa Monica, CA: Perceval Press, 2006.

Exhibitions

One-person exhibitions 
 America the Beautiful. Santa Monica Museum of Art (September 17 – November 26, 2005)
 America the Beautiful. DCKT Contemporary (January 7 – February 11, 2006)
 A Fifth of Tomorrow. Collages and journals. Western Project (June 9 – July 14, 2007)
 Sleep in Spite of Thunder. DCKT Contemporary (May 23 – July 18, 2008)

Two-person exhibitions 
 Exene Cervenka and Wayne White: We're Not The Jet Set. Paintings, collages and sculptures. Western Project (July 25 – September 5, 2009)

Group exhibitions 
 Hollywood Satan. Mark Moore Gallery, Santa Monica, CA (December 5–25, 1998)
 Forming: The Early Days of L.A. Punk. Track 16 Gallery, Santa Monica, CA (April 10 – June 15, 1999)
 Capital Art: On the Culture of Punishment. Track 16 Gallery, Santa Monica, CA (February 3 – March 31, 2001)
 Cruel And Unusual: A Benefit For The West Memphis Three. sixspace, Los Angeles, CA (2003)
 Vexing: Female Voices from East L.A. Punk. Claremont Museum of Art, Claremont, CA (May 18 – August 31, 2008); Museo de las Artes, Universidad de Guadalajara, Guadalajara, Mexico (2008–2009)
 Yard Dog, Austin, TX (2009)
 Celestial Ash: Assemblages from Los Angeles. Craft and Folk Art Museum, Los Angeles, CA (April 11 – September 13, 2009)
 Western Project: The First Six Years. Western Project, Culver City, CA (November 7 – December 30, 2009)
 Tanya Batura / Exene Cervenka / Amir H. Fallah / Will Yackulic. Western Project, Culver City, CA (August 14 – September 11, 2010)
 Never Can Say Goodbye, No Longer Empty. at former Tower Records Store, West 4th Street & Broadway, New York, NY (2010)
 Girls Just Want to Have Funds. P.P.O.W Gallery, New York, NY (2010)
 DCKT @ Miami Project. Midtown Art District (December 3–8, 2013)

Exhibition catalogs 
 Bessy, Claude, and Edward Colver. Forming: The Early Days of L.A. Punk. Santa Monica, CA: Smart Art Press, 2000.  Track 16 Gallery (April 10 – June 5, 1999). Cervenka was co-editor, essay: "Forming: the Early Days of L.A. Punk"
 Botey, Mariana, and Pilar Perez. Capitalart: On the Culture of Punishment. Santa Monica, CA: Smart Art Press, 2001.  Track 16 Gallery (February 3 – March 31, 2001)
 Cervenka, Exene. Exene Cervenka: America the Beautiful. Santa Monica, CA: Smart Art Press, 2005.

See also 
 List of female rock singers
 X (American band)

References

External links 

 
 
  Exene Cervenka at DCKT Contemporary

1956 births
American women singers
American folk singers
American punk rock singers
American spoken word poets
Bloodshot Records artists
Living people
Women punk rock singers
Singers from Florida
People with multiple sclerosis
Singers from Chicago
The Knitters members
X (American band) members
People from Mokena, Illinois
American conspiracy theorists